HPLH1 is a protein associated with hemophagocytic lymphohistiocytosis type 1.